Krasny Kavkaz (Russian for Red Caucasus) was a Soviet, later Russian  of the Black Sea Fleet.

Service history
From 1 June 1967 to 31 June 1967 and from 1 January to 31 December 1968 the destroyer rendered assistance to the armed forces of Egypt and from 5 October to 24 October 1973 - to the armed forces of Syria. From 10 March 1981 to 19 July 1984 the ship has been repaired in Sevastopol. Krasny Kavkaz was initially tasked with confronting the U.S. warships during the 1988 Black Sea incident, but due to her technical problems the frigate Bezzavetny was dispatched instead.

References

External links

1966 ships
Ships built at Shipyard named after 61 Communards
Kashin-class destroyers of the Soviet Navy
Cold War destroyers of the Soviet Union